My Three Merry Widows (in Spanish Mis tres viudas alegres) is a Mexican comedy film directed by Fernando Cortés. It was filmed in 1953 and starring Amalia Aguilar, Lilia del Valle and Silvia Pinal.

Plot
Don Jose Samaniego (Adalberto Martinez), an old and ridiculous man, marries Silvia (Silvia Pinal), a 20-year-old girl. On their wedding night before the marriage be consummated, Don José died after suffering a seizure. Through the obituaries many people learn about his death and go to the cemetery. Among the visitors is Amalia (Amalia Aguilar), with her marriage certificate and says that in their wedding day, Don José got a call, went and never returned. Also coming Lilia (Lilia del Valle), another widow, saying that her husband was kidnapped on their wedding night. The day when the will of Don José is read, the three women learns that the man also had a child with a cook. He asks who seek this woman and wait five years to take part in the inheritance.

Cast
 Amalia Aguilar ... Amalia
 Lilia del Valle ... Lilia
 Silvia Pinal ... Silvia
 Adalberto Martínez ... Don José / Pepito
 José María Linares-Rivas ... Don Caledonio
 Tito Novaro ... Estanislao Girao

Reviews
In 1952 the Cuban rumbera Amalia Aguilar, Lilia del Valle and Lilia Prado staged The Three Merry Midwives and The Interested Women, directed by Tito Davison and Rogelio A. González respectively. As the films were successful, the formula is repeated and Silvia Pinal was chosen to replace Lilia Prado to team up with the other two actresses and interpreting together three sleepers, sympathetic, cheerful and, above all, very sexy women. The story runs after an absurd plot with supposedly scientific nonsense led by the Puerto Rican filmmaker Fernando Cortes, less skilled than Davison, but the grace of the three beautiful actresses and some good dancing numbers of Adalberto Martínez and Amalia Aguilar, make the movie bearable.

In 1953 Cortés filmed a new film with the three actresses: The Loving Women (Las cariñosas).

References

External links
 
 My Three Merry Widows on FilmAffinity

1953 films
Mexican black-and-white films
Mexican comedy films
1950s Spanish-language films
1953 comedy films
1950s Mexican films